Alexis Ashworth is a Canadian weightlifter. She is from Saskatchewan hamlet of Oungre in Canada. She won the silver medal in weightlifting at the 2022 Commonwealth Games in the women's 71kg category.

References

Living people
Canadian female weightlifters
Commonwealth Games silver medallists for Canada
Commonwealth Games medallists in weightlifting
Weightlifters at the 2022 Commonwealth Games
1999 births
21st-century Canadian women
Medallists at the 2022 Commonwealth Games